Thomas E. Gordon is the sixth presiding bishop of the Orthodox Anglican Church and metropolitan archbishop of the Orthodox Anglican Communion. On November 16, 2014, Creighton Jones announced his retirement and nominated Gordon, then his suffragan, to be his successor. Gordon became metropolitan on April 18, 2015.

Gordon is the son of a Presbyterian minister and a Christian school teacher, was born and raised in Williamsport, Pennsylvania. His previous appointments in the Orthodox Anglican Church include rector and organizing minister of St. Philip the Evangelist Anglican Church in Charlotte, North Carolina, as well as canon to the ordinary, suffragan bishop, and bishop coadjutor.

He is a graduate of St. Andrew's Theological College and Seminary, and is married to Janet Gordon. They have three sons.

References

External links
Thomas Gordon
Orthodox Anglican Church website
Orthodox Anglican Communion website
St. Andrew's Theological College & Seminary website

Year of birth missing (living people)
Presiding Bishops of the Anglican Orthodox Church
Living people
21st-century Anglican archbishops
21st-century American clergy